Perchas is a barrio in the municipality of Morovis, Puerto Rico. Perchas has about 11 sectors and its population in 2010 was 1,336.

Puerto Rico Highway 155 from Perchas in Morovis takes one to the adjoining municipality of Orocovis.

History
Puerto Rico was ceded by Spain in the aftermath of the Spanish–American War under the terms of the Treaty of Paris of 1898 and became an unincorporated territory of the United States. In 1899, the United States Department of War conducted a census of Puerto Rico finding that the population of Perchas barrio was 1,124.

Hurricane Maria on September 20, 2017, caused a landslide in Perchas that caused a huge rock to teeter above Puerto Rico Highway 155, threatening homes, infrastructure and motorists. Six months later, a controlled implosion was used to disintegrate the huge rock in order for the area to be cleared of the threat.

Residents of bordering barrios then had to traverse through Perchas to reach Pueblo because over 90% of the roads were blocked by debris due to landslides and destruction to infrastructure.

Sectors

Barrios (which are roughly comparable to minor civil divisions) in turn are further subdivided into smaller local populated place areas/units called  (sectors in English). The types of sectores may vary, from normally sector to urbanización to reparto to barriada to residencial, among others.

The following sectors are in Perchas barrio:

, and  
.

Gallery

See also

 List of communities in Puerto Rico

References

External links
 

Barrios of Morovis, Puerto Rico